Zauner is a surname. Notable people with the surname include:

David Zauner (born 1985), Austrian ski jumper
Gary Zauner (born 1950), American football coach
Franz Anton von Zauner, Austrian sculptor
Franz Zauner (pilot) (1916-2008), Austrian pilot
Michelle Zauner (born 1989), Korean-American musician and author
Peter Zauner (born 1983), Austrian badminton player

See also
Zauner OZ-4 a modified version of Schreder HP-14, a Richard Schreder-designed all-metal glider aircraft that was offered as a kit for homebuilding during the 1960s and 1970s 
Zauner OZ-5 One-Yankee, an American high-wing, T-tailed, single seat, 15 metre class glider that was designed and constructed by Otto Zauner